The Soul of a Tango (Spanish:El Alma de un tango) is a 1945 Argentine musical film  directed and written by Julio Irigoyen and starring Héctor Palacios, Elisa Labardén and Lea Conti. The film was part of the popular genre of tango films. It premiered on 20 April 1945.

Cast
 Héctor Palacios		
 Elisa Labardén		
 Lea Conti		
 Percival Murray		
 Tino Tori		
 Warly Ceriani		
 Lea Ocampo		
 Mauricio Bilevich		
 Trio Gedeón		
 Yuria Kramer
 Enrique Vico Carré

References

Bibliography
 Plazaola, Luis Trelles. South American Cinema. La Editorial UPR, 1989.

External links

1945 films
Argentine musical drama films
1940s Spanish-language films
Argentine black-and-white films
Tango films
Films directed by Julio Irigoyen
Argentine romantic musical films
1945 romantic drama films
1940s romantic musical films
1940s Argentine films